Mislav Rosandić (born 26 January 1995) is a Croatian-born Slovak professional ice hockey defenceman for the HC Bílí Tygři Liberec of the Czech Extraliga.

Career statistics

Regular season and playoffs

International

Awards and honors

References

External links
 

1995 births
Living people
Sportspeople from Zagreb
Slovak people of Croatian descent
Slovak ice hockey defencemen
HC '05 Banská Bystrica players
HC 07 Detva players
HC Slovan Bratislava players
Stadion Hradec Králové players
HC ZUBR Přerov players
HC Vítkovice players
HC Bílí Tygři Liberec players
Ice hockey players at the 2022 Winter Olympics
Medalists at the 2022 Winter Olympics
Olympic bronze medalists for Slovakia
Olympic medalists in ice hockey
Olympic ice hockey players of Slovakia
Slovak expatriate ice hockey players in the Czech Republic
Croatian ice hockey defencemen
Croatian expatriate sportspeople in the Czech Republic
Croatian expatriate ice hockey people